St. Albans School (STA) is an independent college preparatory day and boarding school for boys in grades 4–12, located in Washington, D.C. The school is named after Saint Alban, traditionally regarded as the first British martyr. Within the St. Albans community, the school is commonly referred to as "S-T-A." It enrolls approximately 590 day students in grades 4–12, and 30 additional boarding students in grades 9–12, and is affiliated with the National Cathedral School and the co-ed Beauvoir, the National Cathedral Elementary School, all of which are located on the grounds of the Washington National Cathedral. St. Albans, along with the affiliated schools and the Washington National Cathedral, are members of the Protestant Episcopal Cathedral Foundation. It is regarded among the most prestigious secondary schools in the United States.

The school mascot is the bulldog, a symbol adopted under the school's fourth headmaster, Canon Charles S. Martin, because of Martin's fondness for his pet bulldogs. The St. Albans motto, "Pro Ecclesia et Pro Patria," translates to "For Church and Country." St. Albans requires all students to attend Chapel twice a week in The Little Sanctuary. The school seeks to develop in its students a sense of moral responsibility through Chapel, its Honor Code, and a co-curricular social service program.

A 2004 article in The Wall Street Journal found that among U.S. schools, St. Albans had the 11th-highest success rate in placing graduates at 10 selective universities. A 2015 article in Business Insider named St. Albans the smartest boarding school in the United States on the basis of average SAT scores.

Approximately 80% of the faculty at the school have advanced degrees. The school also maintains one writer-in-residence, who teaches English classes while developing his or her work. (A past writer-in-residence is Curtis Sittenfeld, who worked on her best-selling novel Prep while at St. Albans).

History
The school was founded in 1909, with $300,000 ($7.2 million in 2015 dollars) in funding bequeathed by Harriet Lane Johnston, niece of President James Buchanan. Initially, it was a school for boy choristers to the Washington National Cathedral, a program that the school continues today.

The school opened its new Upper School building, Marriott Hall, in 2009–2010. The firm Skidmore, Owings, and Merrill LLP, designed the new building, which has been the subject of articles in numerous publications, including The Washington Post, The Architects Newspaper, Building Stone Magazine, Arch Daily, Architecture DC, Mid-Atlantic Real Estate Journal, Construction, School Planning & Management, and the American Society of Civil Engineers.

Notable alumni

Jonathan Agronsky '64, journalist and author
Malcolm Baker '87, professor at Harvard Business School and former Olympic rower
Charles F. Bass, United States Congressman from New Hampshire
Evan Bayh '74, former United States Senator for Indiana
Ralph Becker, mayor of Salt Lake City
John Bellinger '78, Legal Adviser of the Department of State (2005–2009)
Odell Beckham Jr., current wide receiver for the Los Angeles Rams, attended 7th grade after his home town was struck by Hurricane Katrina.
James Bennet, '84 former editor-in-chief of the Atlantic Monthly magazine
Michael Bennet '83, United States Senator for Colorado
James Boasberg '81, District Judge on the United States District Court for the District of Columbia
Joshua Bolten '72, former White House Chief of Staff
William L. Borden '38, executive director of United States Congress Joint Committee on Atomic Energy
Matt Bowman, pitcher in Major League Baseball
Keith Bradsher '82, journalist, The New York Times chief Hong-Kong correspondent
Brooke "Untz" Brewer '16, Former NFL athlete and world class sprinter
Clancy Brown '77, actor and former chairman of the board of Brown Publishing Company
Olin Browne '77, professional golfer, 3-time PGA Tour event champion
Garnett Bruce '85, opera director
Neil Bush '73, son of President George H. W. Bush, brother of President George W. Bush
Josh Byrnes, vice president of baseball operations for the Los Angeles Dodgers
Goodloe Byron '45, United States Congressman from Maryland's 6th District
Lee Caplin '65, entertainment executive, co-producer True Detective
John Casey '57, novelist
Benjamin Chew '80, attorney to media personalities Cher, Johnny Depp
Michael Collins '48, Apollo 11 astronaut
Peter Cook, Bloomberg anchor and journalist
Damon M. Cummings '27, United States navy officer and Navy Cross recipient
Walter J. Cummings, Jr., Solicitor General of the United States from 1952 to 1953; judge on the United States Court of Appeals for the Seventh Circuit
Jonathan W. Daniels '18, White House Press Secretary, author
Eli Whitney Debevoise II '70, United States executive director of The World Bank 
Brandon Victor Dixon '99, Tony-nominated Broadway actor
Peter Feldman '00, commissioner of the U.S. Consumer Product Safety Commission
George M. Ferris, Jr. '44, president of the firm Ferris Baker Watts
Adrian S. Fisher, diplomat and lawyer, Legal Adviser of the Department of State (1949–1953)
Miles Fisher '02, television and film actor
Harold Ford Jr. '88, former United States Congressman, Fox News contributor, and current head of the Democratic Leadership Council
Rodney Frelinghuysen '64, United States Congressman from New Jersey
David Gardner '84, co-founder of The Motley Fool
Tom Gardner '86, co-founder of The Motley Fool
James W. Gilchrist, Maryland Assemblyman representing Montgomery County, Maryland
George H. Goodrich, justice, Superior Court of the District of Columbia
Al Gore Jr. '65, former Congressman and United States Senator from Tennessee, Nobel laureate, and the 45th Vice President of the United States.
Donald E. Graham '62, former chairman of The Washington Post
Thomas N.E. Greville '27, mathematician 
Paul Greenberg '86, former CEO of CollegeHumor and current CEO of fashion magazine Nylon
Ernest Graves, Jr. '41, lieutenant general, former director of Defense Security Cooperation Agency
Frederick Hauck '58, astronaut, commander of Space Shuttle Discovery
André Heinz '88, environmentalist
Samuel Herrick '28, astronomer, professor at UCLA
Bill Hobby '49, Lieutenant Governor of Texas 1973–1991
Stuart Holliday '83, former U.S. Representative for Special Political Affairs in the United Nations and President of Meridian International Center
Jesse Hubbard '94, professional lacrosse player
Danny Hultzen '08, baseball pitcher, 2nd overall pick of the 2011 Major League Baseball Draft by the Seattle Mariners
Brit Hume '61, Fox News television anchor
Reed Hundt '65, former FCC Chairman
Prince Feisal bin Al Hussein of Jordan '81, son of King Hussein and Princess Muna al-Hussein, and the younger brother of King Abdullah II.
Adi Ignatius '76, editor-in-chief of Harvard Business Review.
David Ignatius '68, Washington Post columnist, author of Body of Lies
Uzodinma Iweala '00, author
Jesse Jackson, Jr. '84, United States Congressman, son of the Rev. Jesse Jackson, Sr.
Steven Berlin Johnson '86, popular science author
Bo Jones '64, former publisher and CEO of The Washington Post, director of the Associated Press
Draper L. Kauffman, past superintendent of the United States Naval Academy
Thomas Kean '53, former governor of New Jersey, chairman of the 9/11 Commission, attended 4th and 5th grades
Edward Kennedy, Jr. '79, founder of the Marwood Group, son of senator Ted Kennedy
Randall Kennedy '73, Harvard Law School professor
Tyler Kent, American diplomat convicted of spying for the Nazi Germany government during World War II
John Kerry, United States Secretary of State, attended lower school for several years
Nick Kotz '51, journalist, author, and historian who won the Pulitzer Prize for National Reporting in 1968
Damian Kulash '94, lead singer of rock band OK Go
Robert D. Lamberton '60, classics scholar, poet, and translator, professor at Washington University in St. Louis
Tom Ligon '58, character actor in Paint Your Wagon (film), Bang the Drum Slowly, The Young and the Restless, and Oz
Henry Cabot Lodge, Jr., United States Senator from Massachusetts, United States Ambassador to United Nations, South Vietnam, and Special Envoy to the Vatican, 
John Davis Lodge, Governor of Connecticut and former United States Ambassador to Spain, Argentina, and Switzerland
Nick Lowery '74, former professional football player, Kansas City Chiefs
J. W. Marriott, Jr. '50, billionaire, chairman and former CEO of Marriott International
Ethan McSweeny, former artistic director of the American Shakespeare Center
Jay Pierrepont Moffat, Jr. '49, U.S. Ambassador to Chad
Arthur Cotton Moore '54, architect known for the Washington Harbour development, renovation of the Thomas Jefferson Building, and the restoration of The Cairo.
Dave Nalle, political writer, vice chairman of the Republican Liberty Caucus
Bill Oakley '84, toymaker, fast-food reviewer, former executive producer of The Simpsons
Jonathan Ogden '92, professional football player
Jameson Parker, former co-star of 1980s television series Simon & Simon
Michael J. Petrucelli, founder, Clearpath Inc., deputy director and acting director of US Citizenship and Immigration Services at the US Department of Homeland Security
Laughlin Phillips '42, former director of The Phillips Collection
David Plotz '86, writer and editor at Slate
Ben Quayle, U.S. Congressman from Arizona and son of Dan Quayle
Manny Quezada, basketball player for Atlético Petróleos de Luanda
James Reston Jr. '59, journalist and writer
John D. Rockefeller V '88, lecturer at Johns Hopkins University, eldest son of West Virginia Senator Jay Rockefeller
Justin Rockefeller '98, political activist and fifth generation member of the Rockefeller family
James Roosevelt, son of Franklin Roosevelt, U.S. Congressman from California, attended and went on to graduate from Groton School
Kermit Roosevelt III '88, novelist, law professor University of Pennsylvania
Mark Roosevelt '74, superintendent of the Pittsburgh Public Schools, president of Antioch College and St. John's College
Alex Ross '86, music critic of The New Yorker, MacArthur Fellow
Luke Russert '04, NBC correspondent and XM Satellite radio host, son of Tim Russert,
Hib Sabin '53, American sculptor and educator
Barton Seaver '97, chef and author
Timothy Shriver '77, chairman of Special Olympics, son of Eunice Kennedy Shriver and Sargent Shriver
Bruce Smathers '61, former Florida Secretary of State, son of US Senator George Smathers
Burr Steers, director of the film Igby Goes Down
William R. Steiger '87, chief of staff of the United States Agency for International Development
Andrew Stevovich '66, artist
Ned Temko '70, editor of The Jewish Chronicle
Russell E. Train '37, former director of the EPA, founder/chairman emeritus of World Wildlife Fund
James Trimble III '43, baseball player and marine, killed in action at Iwo Jima
Ian Urbina '90, journalist, The New York Times, senior investigative reporter, and director of The Outlaw Ocean Project.
Gore Vidal, author and writer, attended and went on to graduate from Phillips Exeter Academy
Peter Jon de Vos '56, former United States Ambassador to Mozambique, Cape Verde, Guinea-Bissau, Liberia, Tanzania, and Costa Rica
Antonio J. Waring Jr. '34, archeologist who defined Southeastern Ceremonial Complex
John Warner, former United States Secretary of the Navy, five-term Senator from Virginia, attended a summer session 
Josh Weinstein '84, former executive producer of The Simpsons
Jonathan Williams, poet, founder of The Jargon Society
John C. White '94, Louisiana Superintendent of Education since 2012
Sheldon Whitehouse, Rhode Island attorney general, U.S. Senator from Rhode Island, attended and went on to graduate from St. Paul's School
David Whiting, journalist and film agent, who mysteriously died during production of The Man Who Loved Cat Dancing, was expelled in his junior year.
Thomas Wilner '62, lawyer at Shearman & Sterling who represented Guantanamo Bay detention camp detainees
Craig Windham, NPR radio journalist
Robert Wisdom '72, actor, played Bunny Colvin on HBO's The Wire
Paul Woodruff '61, classicist, professor, dean at the University of Texas at Austin
Jeffrey Wright '83, Emmy and Tony Award-winning actor
Joon Yun '86, physician and hedge fund manager
Jeffrey Zients '84, director of the U.S. Office of Management & Budget, first Chief Performance Officer of the United States

References

External links

1909 establishments in Washington, D.C.
Boys' schools in the United States
Educational institutions established in 1909
Episcopal schools in the United States
Preparatory schools in Washington, D.C.
Private elementary schools in Washington, D.C.
Private high schools in Washington, D.C.
Private middle schools in Washington, D.C.
Washington National Cathedral